Geremias Ribeiro Júnior (born December 13, 1993 in Salvador) commonly known as Júnior Todinho, is a Brazilian professional footballer who plays as a forward for Brusque.

Honours

Cuiabá
Copa Verde: 2019
Campeonato Mato-Grossense: 2019

References

External links
 OGol.com Profile

1993 births
Living people
Brazilian footballers
Association football forwards
Serrano Sport Club players
Esporte Clube Primeiro Passo Vitória da Conquista players
Esporte Clube Vitória players
Cuiabá Esporte Clube players
Guarani FC players
Esporte Clube Juventude players
Sportspeople from Salvador, Bahia